The House of Alvensleben is an ancient, Low German (niederdeutsch) noble family from the Altmark region, whose earliest known member, Wichard de Alvensleve, is first mentioned in 1163 as a ministerialis of the Bishopric of Halberstadt. The family name derives from Alvensleben Castle (today Bebertal, district of Börde in Saxony-Anhalt). They are one of the oldest extant German aristocratic families.

History 

The family line begins with Gebhard von Alvensleben, probably Wichard's son, mentioned between 1190 and 1216. The Alvenslebens were hereditary seneschals (Erbtruchsessen) of the Bishopric and Principality of Halberstadt from the 12th century. In the beginning, they served as Burgmannen in the bishop's castle of Alvensleben. Around 1270 they acquired their own family estate, Erxleben Castle, and, around 1324, Kalbe Castle.

Friedrich von Alvensleben (c 1265-1313) was master of the Knights Templar in their German and Slavic districts. His elder brothers founded two branches, the white and the black Alvenslebens, whereas the red branch died out in  1553.

The family acquired many further estates, some located in the Archbishopric of Magdeburg, the Margraviate of Brandenburg and the Duchy of Brunswick. Gebhard XIV. von Alvensleben (mentioned 1393–1425) was part of the noblemen's opposition against Frederick I, Elector of Brandenburg, the first Hohenzollern to rule Brandenburg, but was later subdued by him.

The family generated two catholic bishops of Havelberg in the 15th and 16th centuries, but then became Lutheran Protestants. Joachim I. von Alvensleben (1514-1588) promoted the reformation in the Altmark region. The family provided many heads of government in this province, as well as a number of ministers, generals and diplomats in different Northern German states. Several lines of the family were made Prussian counts, beginning in 1798, and the family received a hereditary seat in the Prussian House of Lords. Most of their properties were expropriated in 1945 in communist East Germany. Their main family estates were:

Coat of arms 
The family coat of arms shows in gold two red fesses, the upper one emblazoned with two, the lower one with one silver roses. On the helmet with its red and gold mantling there is an upright, gnarled branch in red and gold, two branches to the right and one to the left, crowned with a silver rose.

Personalities 
 Achaz Henry of Alvensleben (1716–1777), Prussian general
 Albert, Count of Alvensleben (1794–1858), Prussian minister of finance
 Albert, Count of Alvensleben-Schönborn (1848–1928), member of the Prussian House of Lords
 Alkmar II of Alvensleben (1841–1898), lieutenant general and commandant of Breslau
 Alkmar of Alvensleben (1874–1946), German doctor
 Andrew of Alvensleben (died 1565), castellan
 Anna Maria of Alvensleben (1659–1724), eldest daughter of Gebhard Christopher of Alvensleben at Erxleben I
 Armgard of Alvensleben (1893–1970), abbess of Heiligengrabe Abbey and managing director of the German Evangelical Railway Mission
 Berthold I of Alvensleben, Bishop of Hildesheim
 
 Christian of Alvensleben (born 1941), German photographer
 Constantine of Alvensleben (1809–1892), Prussian general
 Edward of Alvensleben (1787–1876), Landrat
 Frederica of Alvensleben, née von Klinglin (1749–1799), actress 
 Frederick of Alvensleben (urk. 1301–1308), last Master of the Order of the Templers in Alemannia and Slavonia 
 Frederick Joachim of Alvensleben (1833–1912), Landrat 
 Frederick John, Count of Alvensleben (1836–1913), ambassador
 Ferdinand, Count of Alvensleben (1803–1889), landowner and member of the Prussian House of Lords
 Gebhard XIV of Alvensleben (erw. 1393–1425), castellan at Gardelegen and governor (‚‘Landeshauptmann‘‘)
 Gebhard XVII of Alvensleben (died 1541), governor (Landeshauptmann)
 Gebhard XXIII of Alvensleben (1584–1627), Governor (‚‘Landeshauptmann‘‘) Beeskow uns Storkow
 Gebhard XXV of Alvensleben (1618–1681), statesman and historian
 Gebhard John I of Alvensleben (1576–1631), lord of the manor and builder of an observatory
 Gebhard Charles Ludolf of Alvensleben (1798–1867), Prussian general
 Gebhard John Achaz of Alvensleben (1764–1840), landowner
 Gebhard Nicholas of Alvensleben (1824–1909), senior master forester
 Gustav of Alvensleben (1803–1881), Prussian general
 Gustav Hermann of Alvensleben (1827–1905), Prussian general
 Gustav Constantine of Alvensleben (1879–1965), businessman in Vancouver, Canada
 Hans Bodo, Count of Alvensleben-Neugattersleben (1882–1961), landowner and President of the German Gentleman's Club
 Hermann of Alvensleben (1809–1887), Prussian general
 Joachim I of Alvensleben (1514–1588), scholar and reformer
 John Ernest, Count of Alvensleben (1758–1827), cathedral dean and Brunswick minister
 John Frederick II of Alvensleben (1657–1728), Hanoverian minister, builder of Hundisburg Castle 
 John Frederick Charles of Alvensleben (1714–1795), British-Hanoverian minister
 John Frederick Charles II of Alvensleben (1778−1831), Prussian general
 John Louis Gebhard of Alvensleben (1816–1895), lord of the manor and musician
 Charles Augustus I of Alvensleben (1661–1697), privy councillor in Hanover and Canon of Magdeburg
 Kathleen King von Alvensleben, architect
 Kuno of Alvensleben (1588–1638), Canon of Magdeburg 
 Ludolf of Alvensleben (1844–1912), Prussian major general and lord of the manor 
 Ludolf X of Alvensleben (1511–1596), statesman 
 Ludolf Augustus Frederick of Alvensleben (1743–1822), royal Prussian major general, commandant of Glaz Fortress and Inspector of the Silesian Army
 Ludolf-Hermann of Alvensleben (1901–1970), Nazi Reichstag MP and lieutenant general in the Waffen SS
 Ludolf Udo of Alvensleben (1852–1923), county deputy and Prussian politician
 Ludwig von Alvensleben (1800-1868), author
 Louis Charles Alexander of Alvensleben (1778–1842), Prussian officer and literary figure in Theodor Fontane's novel Schach von Wuthenow
 Louis of Alvensleben (1805–1869), landowner and member of the Prussian House of Lords
 Louis of Alvensleben (playwright) (1800–1868), German playwright
 Margarethe of Alvensleben (1840–1899), abbess of Heiligengrabe Abbey
 Oscar of Alvensleben (1831–1903), German landscape artist
 Phillip Charles, Count of Alvensleben (1745–1802), Prussian state and cabinet minister
 Professor Reimar von Alvensleben (born 1940), agrarian economist
 Rudolf Anthony of Alvensleben (1688–1737), Hanoverian minister
 Udo Gebhard Ferdinand of Alvensleben (1814–1879), landowner and member of the Prussian House of Lords
 Udo III of Alvensleben (1823–1910), landowner and author
 Udo von Alvensleben from Wittenmoor (1897–1962), German art historian
 Sophia of Alvensleben (1516–1590), abbess of Althaldensleben Abbey
 Valentine of Alvensleben (1529–1594), castellan at Gardelegen and Erxleben
 Werner II of Alvensleben (erw. 1428–1472), castellan at Gardelegen, Electoral Brandenburg councillor and court marshal (Oberhofmarschall)
 Werner VIII of Alvensleben (1802–1877), Prussian general
 Werner, Count of Alvensleben-Neugattersleben  (1840–1929), landowner and businessman
 Werner von Alvensleben (1875–1947), merchant and politician 
 Wichard von Alvensleben (1902–1982), farmer and forester, officer
 Wichard von Alvensleben (Go player) (1937–2016), lawyer, Go player, Chess player

Sources 
 Siegmund Wilhelm Wohlbrück: Geschichtliche Nachrichten von dem Geschlecht von Alvensleben und dessen Gütern. 3 Bände, Berlin 1819–1829. Band I, Band II, Band III
 George Adalbert von Mülverstedt: Codex Diplomaticus Alvenslebianus. Urkundensammlung des Geschlechts von Alvensleben. 4 Bände, Magdeburg 1879, 1882, 1885, 1900.
 Hellmut Kretzschmar: Geschichtliche Nachrichten von dem Geschlecht von Alvensleben seit 1800.  Burg 1930
 Udo von Alvensleben-Wittenmoor: Alvenslebensche Burgen und Landsitze. Dortmund 1960.
 Genealogisches Handbuch des Adels, Vol. 53, 1972, Adelslexikon

See also 
 List of German nobility

References

External links 

 Internet page of the House of Alvensleben
 House of Alvensleben in the Wildenfels castle archive

 
Alvensleben
Prussian nobility
European noble families